August Jernberg (16 September 1826 – 22 June 1896) was a Swedish artist. He was a member of the Düsseldorf school of painting.

Biography
He was mainly a painter of portraits in his early years; he also painted historical and biblical pictures. In the 1860s he became a genre and landscape painter. He studied at the Royal Swedish Academy of Fine Arts in Stockholm from 1843 to 1846 and then traveled to Paris, where he studied from 1847 to 1853 with Thomas Couture (1815–1879).

He exhibited at the Scandinavian Art Exhibition at Stockholm in 1850 and at the  Exposition Universelle (1855) at Paris. In 1854, he settled in Düsseldorf  and was admitted  as a member to the Kunstakademie Düsseldorf. He remained in  Düsseldorf until his death, with the exceptions of some shorter trips.

In 1848, he married Margareta Bjurling (1823–1903). They were the parents of several children including their son Olof Jernberg (1855–1935) who was a German landscape and marine painter.

Gallery

References

External links

August Jernberg  Lexikonett Amanda  (in Swedish)

1826 births
1896 deaths
19th-century Swedish painters
Swedish male painters
19th-century German painters
German male painters
Swedish emigrants to Germany
People from Gävle
Artists from Düsseldorf
19th-century German male artists
19th-century Swedish male artists
Düsseldorf school of painting